Shanghai South Railway Station is an interchange station between Lines 1, 3 and 15 of the Shanghai Metro. It is the southern terminus of Line 3.

Both the metro station and the associated railway station were formerly named Xinlonghua when Line 1 first opened on 28 May 1993. The interchange with Line 3 opened with the opening of that line on 26 December 2000. The interchange with line 15 opened on 23 January 2021.

Places nearby 

 Shanghai South railway station

Gallery

References 

Shanghai Metro stations in Xuhui District
Line 1, Shanghai Metro
Line 3, Shanghai Metro
Line 15, Shanghai Metro
Railway stations in China opened in 1993
Railway stations in Shanghai